Livin' in Exile is the third studio album by Blood for Blood, and was released on July 13, 1999. It features Motörhead's "Ace Of Spades" as an unlisted track.

Track listing
 "No Tomorrow (Holdin' Court of the Eve of the Apocalypse)" – 1:36
 "Cheap Wine" – 2:08
 "Eulogy for a Dream" – 2:27
 "Anywhere But Here (Maybe Someday)" – 2:35
 "Nothing for You" – 2:29
 "Livin' in Exile" – 4:13
 "Still Fucked Up" – 2:44
 "Ace of Spades" (Lemmy, Phil Taylor, Eddie Clarke) – 4:03

 All songs written by White Trash Rob unless stated
Track 8 was an unlisted and uncredited track

Personnel

 Buddha (vocals)
 White Trash Rob (guitar, vocals)
 McFarland (bass)
 Mike Mahoney (drums)
 Recorded at The Outpost in Stoughton, Massachusetts, USA
 Produced by Jim Siegel and White Trash Rob
 Mastered by Henk Kooistra at 9West Mastering, Marlborough, Massachusetts, USA

External links
Victory Records

1999 albums
Blood for Blood albums
Victory Records albums